French football club SC Bastia's 1995–96 season. Finished 15th place in league. Top scorer of the season, including 20 goals in 20 league matches have been Anto Drobnjak. Was eliminated to Coupe de France end of 64 and the Coupe de la Ligue was able to be among the final 32 teams.

Transfers

In 
Summer
 William and Jean-Jacques Eydelie from Benfica
 Bruno Alicarte from Montpellier
 Rémy Loret from Toulouse
 Piotr Swierczewski from St. Etienne
 Dume Franchi from Bastia B

Winter
 No.

Out 
Summer
 Laurent Casanova to Lyon
 Stéphane Ziani to Rennes
 Pascal Camadini to Perpignan
 Gilles Leclerc to ASOA Valence
 Eric Dewilder to Gazélec Ajaccio
 Jean-Luc Bernard to Beaucaire
 Jacky Canosi to Poitiers
 Bernard Maraval to Sochaux
 Franck Burnier and Flavio to retired

Winter
 No.

Squad

French Division 1

League table

Results summary

Results by round

Matches

Coupe de France

Coupe de la Ligue

Top scorers

References

External links 
 All league matches - Football Database  and Corse Football 

SC Bastia seasons
Bastia